The Port of London Act 1908 (8 Edw 7, c 68) was an Act of Parliament of the United Kingdom, which established the Port of London Authority and regulated corporate governance at the Port of London. It merged numerous inefficient and overlapping private companies and gave unified supervision to Britain's most important port. That enabled London to compete more effectively with Hamburg and Rotterdam. David Lloyd George, the President of the Board of Trade, was the major sponsor for the Liberal Party.

Contents
Sections 1(1) to (6) stated there shall be a port authority with ten appointed members by the Board of Trade and London County Council.

Section 1(7) went on to say the following:

References

See also
UK labour law 
UK company law

United Kingdom labour law
United Kingdom company law
United Kingdom Acts of Parliament 1908

History of the London Borough of Newham
History of the London Borough of Southwark
History of the London Borough of Tower Hamlets